Terrence Lamonte Warren (born August 2, 1969) is a former American football player.

While Warren played football at John F. Kennedy High School in Suffolk, Virginia, he became better known as a sprinter. In 1988, as a high school senior, Warren anchored the United States 400 meter relay team to a gold medal in the IAAF World Junior Track and Field Championships in Sudbury, Ontario. He played both sports at Hampton University, where he set several sprinting records and was a two-time NCAA Division II national champion in the 200 meter dash. He was drafted by the Seattle Seahawks in the fifth round of the 1993 NFL Draft. After two years in Seattle, he played briefly for the San Francisco 49ers. After his stint in San Francisco, he signed with the Jacksonville Jaguars, though he never played for the team due to injury. Warren was inducted into the Hampton University Athletics Hall of Fame on January 14, 2011 and the Central Intercollegiate Athletic (CIAA) Hall of Fame on February 27, 2015.

References

External links
NFL player profile
Pro Football Reference profile

1969 births
American football wide receivers
American male sprinters
Hampton Pirates football players
Jacksonville Jaguars players
Living people
Players of American football from Virginia
Sportspeople from Suffolk, Virginia
San Francisco 49ers players
Seattle Seahawks players